Toshio Laiseni (born 19 June 1985) is a Tongan former professional rugby league footballer who played as  or er.

Early career
Laiseni was born in Nukuʻalofa, Tonga.

Laiseni started his football at the Otahuhu Leopards before being selected to represent the Otahuhu-Ellerslie Leopards in the Bartercard Cup. From this competition he was signed by the New Zealand Warriors although he did not play any NRL matches for the club.

Playing career

2006
Laiseni made his first-grade debut for the Cronulla-Sutherland Sharks in round 18 of the 2006 NRL season on 9 July 2006 at Toyota Park against the Wests Tigers. On his debut, Laiseni played a part in his side's first and only try of the game, making a break and setting up Kevin Kingston to score between the posts. Despite Cronulla losing the match 22-10, Laiseni made a solid beginning to his professional rugby league career.

2007
Laiseni signed with the North Queensland Cowboys for the 2007 season, playing mostly for the Young Guns in the Queensland Cup.

2008
In 2008 he played for Newtown in the NSW Cup.

In August 2008, Laiseni was named in the Tonga training squad for the 2008 Rugby League World Cup, and in October 2008 he was named in the final 24-man Tonga squad.

Later years
In 2009 Laiseni returned to New Zealand and played for the Papakura Sea Eagles in the 2009 Fox Memorial. He again represented Tonga in a Test against the New Zealand national rugby league team. In 2010 he was part of the Auckland Vulcans squad in the NSW Cup. He later returned to play for his junior club, the Ellerslie Eagles.

References

External links
Official player profile

1985 births
New Zealand rugby league players
Tonga national rugby league team players
Cronulla-Sutherland Sharks players
Newtown Jets NSW Cup players
Auckland rugby league team players
Otahuhu Leopards players
Papakura Sea Eagles players
Rugby league fullbacks
Tongan emigrants to New Zealand
People from Nukuʻalofa
Living people
Ellerslie Eagles players